California's 17th State Assembly district is one of 80 California State Assembly districts. It is currently represented by Democrat Matt Haney of San Francisco.

District profile 
The district encompasses the eastern portions of the consolidated city-county of San Francisco, including its central financial and governmental core as well as several of the more working-class neighborhoods of the city.

San Francisco County – 58.1%

Election results from statewide races

List of Assembly Members 
Due to redistricting, the 17th district has been moved around different parts of the state. The current iteration resulted from the 2011 redistricting by the California Citizens Redistricting Commission.

Election results 1992 - present

2022 (special)

2020

2018

2016

2014

2012

2010

2008

2006

2004

2002

2000

1998

1996

1994

1992

See also 
 California State Assembly
 California State Assembly districts
 Districts in California

References

External links 
District map from the California Citizens Redistricting Commission

17
Government in the San Francisco Bay Area
Government of San Francisco